Leng Jixuan (born 30 April 2001) is a Chinese footballer currently playing as a forward for Beijing Guoan.

Club career
Leng Jixuan would play for the Beijing Guoan youth team and to gain more playing time he would be loaned out to the China U19 team who were allowed to take part in the third tier of the Chinese pyramid. On his return he would be given an opportunity to participate within senior games when he was part of the AFC Champions League squad, which was a mix of reserves and youth players to participate within centralized venues while the clubs senior players were still dealing with self-isolating measures due to COVID-19. He would make his continental debut in a AFC Champions League game on 26 June 2021 against United City F.C. in a 1-1 draw. 

He would go on to make his debut in a league game on 12 August 2022 against Wuhan Three Towns in a 5-1 defeat. After the game he would be loaned out to second tier club Guangxi Pingguo Haliao, where he made his first appearance for them in a league game on 30 August 2022 against Shanghai Jiading Huilong in a 0-0 draw.

Career statistics
.

References

External links

2001 births
Living people
Chinese footballers
China youth international footballers
Association football forwards
Beijing Guoan F.C. players